Namwambina elgonensis is a species of tephritid or fruit flies in the genus Namwambina of the family Tephritidae.

Distribution
Kenya.

References

Tephritinae
Insects described in 1957
Diptera of Africa